Basilochelys is an extinct genus of land turtle which existed during the early Cretaceous period (Berriasian). Containing the sole species Basilochelys macrobios, its fossils have been found in the Phu Kradung Formation of Northeast Thailand. It is considered to be the most basal member of the group Trionychoidae.

References

 

Trionychidae
Prehistoric turtle genera
Berriasian life
Early Cretaceous turtles
Prehistoric turtles of Asia
Early Cretaceous reptiles of Asia
Cretaceous Thailand
Fossils of Thailand
Fossil taxa described in 2009